The Church of the Sacred Heart of Jesus also known as the Latin Church is a Catholic church located in Latakia, Syria. The church was built in two phases. The first was in 1829, and the second in 1933. It is located on the seafront of the city, near the Port of Latakia.

Franciscans settled in the city of Latakia around 1733, and built a small monastery around 1829. During the French Mandate of Syria and the Lebanon, French engineers expanded the monastery in the 19th of March, 1933 into its current form. About 90 clergies have worked in the church, which is one of the biggest in Latakia, as it contains an abbey, with a large hall and a courtyard containing a garden.

See also
National Evangelical Presbyterian Church of Latakia
Christianity in Syria

References

Churches in Syria
Buildings and structures in Latakia